The 1976 North Dakota State Bison football team was an American football team that represented North Dakota State University during the 1976 NCAA Division II football season as a member of the North Central Conference. In their first year under head coach Jim Wacker, the team compiled a 9–3 record, finished as NCC champion, and lost to Montana State in the Grantland Rice Bowl.

Schedule

References

North Dakota State
North Dakota State Bison football seasons
North Central Conference football champion seasons
North Dakota State Bison football